Sigma Ceti (σ Ceti) is the Bayer designation for a star in the equatorial constellation of Cetus. With an apparent visual magnitude of 4.78, it can be seen with the naked eye on a dark night. Based upon an annual parallax shift of 37.46 mas, it lies at an estimated distance of 87.1 light years from the Sun. It is a probable astrometric binary star system.

The primary, component A, appears to be a normal F-type main sequence star with a stellar classification of F5 V. However, Malaroda (1975) assigned it a classification of F4 IV, which would suggest it is a more evolved subgiant star. It is estimated to have 121% of the Sun's mass and around 150% of the radius of the Sun. With an age of about 2.1 billion years, it is radiating 7.6 times the solar luminosity from its outer atmosphere at an effective temperature of 6,527 K.

Name
This star, along with π Cet, ε Cet and ρ Cet, was Al Sufi's Al Sadr al Ḳaiṭos, the Whale's Breast 

According to the catalogue of stars in the Technical Memorandum 33-507 - A Reduced Star Catalog Containing 537 Named Stars, Al Sadr al Ḳaiṭos were the title for four stars :ρ Cet as Al Sadr al Ḳaiṭos I, this star (σ Cet) as Al Sadr al Ḳaiṭos II, ε Cet as Al Sadr al Ḳaiṭos III and π Cet as Al Sadr al Ḳaiṭos IV''

References

External links 
http://www.alcyone.de/SIT/bsc/HR0740.html
http://server3.wikisky.org/starview?object_type=1&object_id=1384

Cetus, Sigma
Double stars
Cetus (constellation)
Cetus, Sigma
Ceti, 76
Durchmusterung objects
015798
011783
0740
Astrometric binaries